93Queen is a 2018 documentary film on Hasidic women in Borough Park, Brooklyn who form Ezras Nashim, an all-female ambulance corps. The film follows Judge Rachel Freier, a Hasidic lawyer running for public office as a New York Judge, and mother of six who is determined to shake up the “boys club” in her Hasidic community by creating the first all-female ambulance corps in the United States, as she negotiates her community initiative within the context of a male-dominated Hasidic community.  

93Queen was filmed in the Hasidic community of Borough Park where EMS corps have long been the province of men. The neighborhood is home to the largest volunteer ambulance corps in the world known as Hatzolah, that organization has steadfastly banned women from its ranks.

The film followed the formation and launch of Ezras Nashim through the organization’s first year on the ground. Freier and the Hasidic women are taking matters into their own hands to provide dignified emergency medical care to the Hasidic women and girls, The spine of the film observes the highs and the lows of creating an organization against incredible odds, in a society where most women don’t drive and a few minutes can mean the difference between life and death, and how female EMTs transport themselves to the scene of an emergency.

The film run time is 90 minutes, and was produced by American Documentary-POV and ITVS. The documentary was directed by film-maker Paula Eiselt. and Co-Produced by Heidi Reinberg, and Marco Williams.

The film made its world premiere on May 1, 2018, at the Hot Docs Canadian International Documentary Festival. The film aired on PBS's POV, marking its television debut, on September 17, 2018.

See also 
 Shekinah Rising (2013)
 Punk Jews (2012)
 Hasidic hipsters

References

External links 
 

 "Review: ‘93Queen’ offers an insider’s view of women’s lives in a self-contained Hasidic community", LA Times, August 14, 2018 
 "Review: ‘93Queen’ Follows Female Jewish EMS Workers in Brooklyn", NY Times, July 24, 2018 

2018 documentary films
Films about Orthodox and Hasidic Jews
Films set in Brooklyn
Women in New York City
Judaism in New York City